The Polaris AM-FIB ("Amphibious Flying Inflatable Boat") is an Italian amphibious flying boat ultralight trike, that was designed and produced by Polaris Motor of Gubbio. The aircraft was introduced in 2003 and was supplied as a complete ready-to-fly-aircraft.

It is now produced by New Polaris 2020 S.L. of Tenerife, Canary Islands, Spain.

Design and development
The AM-FIB was developed from the Polaris FIB as a result of customer demand. It features a cable-braced hang glider-style high-wing, weight-shift controls, a two-seats-in-tandem open cockpit, retractable tricycle landing gear mounted to its inflatable boat hull and a single engine in pusher configuration.

The aircraft's single surface wing is made from bolted-together aluminum tubing and covered in Dacron sailcloth. The  span wing is supported by a single tube-type kingpost and uses an "A" frame weight-shift control bar. The powerplant is a twin cylinder, liquid-cooled, two-stroke, dual-ignition  Rotax 582 engine. The main landing gear is extended and retracted with a manual crank, while the nose gear uses a catch-and-rope mechanism.

Specifications (AM-FIB)

References

External links

2000s Italian sport aircraft
2000s Italian ultralight aircraft
Single-engined pusher aircraft
Ultralight trikes